Greenfish is used as the common name of several unrelated groups of fish:

 Ascension wrasse, (Thalassoma ascensionis) described by Quoy & Gaimard, 1834
 Bluefish, (Pomatomus saltatrix) described by Linnaeus, 1766
 Murray cod, (Maccullochella peelii peelii) described by Mitchell, 1838
 Pollock, (Pollachius pollachius) described by Linnaeus, 1758
 St. Helena wrasse (Thalassoma sanctaehelenae) described by Valenciennes, 1839

"Greenfish" was also formerly used to refer to green cod, fresh or freshly-salted Atlantic cod (Gadus morhua).

Greenfish may also refer to:
 Green Fish, a 1997 South Korean film starring Han Suk-kyu
 Greenfish recirculation technology, advanced sustainable recirculating fish farm systems
 USS Greenfish, a former United States Navy submarine